Gigi Fernández and Natasha Zvereva were the defending champions but only Fernández competed that year with Conchita Martínez.

Fernández and Martínez won in the final 4–6, 6–3, 6–4 against Larisa Neiland and Arantxa Sánchez Vicario.

Seeds
Champion seeds are indicated in bold text while text in italics indicates the round in which those seeds were eliminated.

 Larisa Neiland /  Arantxa Sánchez Vicario (final)
 Gigi Fernández /  Conchita Martínez (champions)
 Lisa Raymond /  Rennae Stubbs (semifinals)
 Elizabeth Smylie /  Linda Wild (first round)

Draw

External links
 1996 Toshiba Classic Doubles draw

Southern California Open
1996 WTA Tour